Laniatores is the largest suborder of the arachnid order Opiliones with over 4,000 described species worldwide. The majority of the species are highly dependent on humid environments and usually correlated with tropical and temperate forest habitats.

Laniatores are typically (relatively) short-legged, hard-plated, spiny Opiliones, common under logs and stones, in leaf litter and in caves. They often have spiny pedipalps and paired or branched claws on the third and fourth pairs of legs.
The largest family is Gonyleptidae Sundevall, 1833, endemic of the Neotropics, with over 800 valid species and showing many cases of maternal and paternal care.

Identification
The dorsal scutum consists of a single piece, with the carapace or peltidium entirely fused with abdominal scutum. The pedipalpus is usually robust and armed with strong spines. The ovipositor is short and unsegmented (derived character state shared with the Dyspnoi). The penis is complex, with many sclerites. Some of the sclerites are movable, with a single penial muscle present. For the most part, the penis is without muscles, instead working by hemolymph pressure.

Subtaxa 
Infraorder "Insidiatores" Loman, 1900 (probably diphyletic)
Superfamily Travunioidea Absolon & Kratochvil, 1932
Superfamily Triaenonychoidea Sørensen, 1886 
Infraorder Grassatores Kury, 2002
Superfamily Epedanoidea Sørensen, 1886
Superfamily Phalangodoidea Simon, 1879 
Superfamily Samooidea Sørensen, 1886
Superfamily Zalmoxoidea Sørensen, 1886
Superfamily Gonyleptoidea Sundevall, 1833

Definitions and limits of superfamilies are still in a state of flux. The largest by far is the Gonyleptoidea, with almost 2,500 described species.

Geographic distribution 

Distribution of subunits of Laniatores is very interesting from the biogeographic point of view. The Travunioidea are typical of northern temperate regions while the Triaenonychoidea make their counterpart in the southern temperate regions. The other superfamilies are tropical, with many noteworthy endemisms and transcontinental relationships.

Footnotes

References
  (eds.) (2007): Harvestmen - The Biology of Opiliones. Harvard University Press 

Harvestmen
Cave arachnids
Arthropod suborders